The March 84C is a highly successful and extremely competitive open-wheel race car, designed by Adrian Newey, and built by March Engineering, to compete in the 1984 IndyCar season. March won 10 out of the 16 races, and took 8 pole positions. Newey's March 84C chassis successfully clinched the 1984 Constructors' Championship, and the 1984 Indianapolis 500 with Rick Mears. It was powered by the Ford-Cosworth DFX turbo V8 engine, but also occasionally used the Buick Indy V6 engine.

References

External links 

Racing cars
March vehicles
American Championship racing cars